Ponerinae is a subtribe of the Orchidaceae tribe Epidendreae. The Ponerinae are characterized by sympodial stems that do not form pseudobulbs, bear two or more leaves, and a racemose or paniculate inflorescence carrying flowers with four or six pollinia.

It comprises four genera:
 Helleriella
 Isochilus
 Nemaconia
 Ponera, the type genus

References

External links 

 
Orchid subtribes